Accord Alliance was founded in March 2008 to support a dialogue on intersex patients and their care.  They are a hosted project of the Tides Center, an organization that supports non-profit groups. Their stated mission is to promote comprehensive and integrated approaches to care that enhance the health and well-being of people and families affected by disorders of sex development (DSD, which includes some conditions referred to as "intersex"). DSD is a term contested by some activists.  Cheryl Chase, founder of the Intersex Society of North America, was a founding member on the advisory board.

See also 
 Intersex human rights
 Intersex medical interventions
 Intersex rights in the United States

References

External links 
 Accord Alliance
 Intersex Society of North America

Organizations established in 2008
Intersex medical and health organizations
Intersex rights in the United States